All About the Funk (stylised as Allabouthefunk) is a funk album released by the Brand New Heavies. After their most identifiable lead singer N'Dea Davenport left the band to pursue a solo career in the mid-1990s, the band rotated in several African-American singer/songwriters Siedah Garrett, Carleen Anderson, and Sy Smith as lead vocalists on previous projects. This independent follow-up release features British singer Nicole Russo on vocals for the entire project. The band covers Jimmy Cliff's "Many Rivers to Cross", as well as covering their own "What Do You Take Me For", which previously featured N'Dea Davenport on their 2003 album We Won't Stop.

Though Allabouthefunk was initially only released to UK and international territories, it is now available in the United States as a digital download.

Track listing

Personnel
The Brand New Heavies
Simon Bartholomew – guitar
Jan Kincaid – drums, vocals
Nicole Russo – vocals
Andrew Levy – bass

Charts

References

2004 albums
The Brand New Heavies albums